The following elections occurred in the year 1985.

Africa
 1985 Cape Verdean parliamentary election
 1985 Gabonese legislative election
 1985 Ivorian parliamentary election
 1985 Ivorian presidential election
 1985 Lesotho general election
 1985 Liberian general election
 1985 Malian general election
 1985 Sierra Leonean presidential election
 1985 São Toméan legislative election
 1985 Tanzanian general election
 1985 Togolese parliamentary election
 1985 Zimbabwean parliamentary election

Asia
 1985 Iranian presidential election
 1985 Kuwaiti general election
 1985 Sabah state election
 1985 South Korean legislative election

Europe
 1985 Belgian general election
 1985 French cantonal elections
 1985 Greek legislative election
 1985 Irish local elections
 1985 Norwegian parliamentary election
 1985 Polish legislative election
 1985 Portuguese legislative election
 1985 Portuguese local election
 1985 Stockholm municipal election
 1985 Swedish general election
 1985 Umbrian regional election
 1985 Venetian regional election

North America
 1985 Guatemalan general election
 1985 Honduran general election
 1985 Salvadoran legislative election

Canada
 1985 Brantford municipal election
 1985 Hamilton, Ontario municipal election
 1985 Newfoundland general election
 1985 Ontario general election
 1985 Ontario municipal elections
 1985 Ottawa municipal election
 1985 Parti Québécois leadership election
 1985 Progressive Conservative Party of Ontario leadership elections
 1985 Quebec general election
 1985 Toronto municipal election
 1985 Yukon general election

Caribbean
 1985 Haitian constitutional referendum

United States
 1985 United States gubernatorial elections
 1985 Pittsburgh mayoral election

Oceania
 1985 Samoan general election
 1985 Timaru by-election

Australia
 1985 Redlands state by-election
 1985 Rockhampton state by-election
 1985 South Australian state election

South America
 1985 Argentine legislative election
 1985 Brazilian presidential election
 1985 Falkland Islands general election

See also

 
1985
Elections